Cincinnati Shakespeare Company is a professional ensemble theater located in downtown Cincinnati focusing on Shakespearean and other classical works.

History

Cincinnati Shakespeare Company originally was incorporated under the name Fahrenheit Theatre Company. Beginning with a small grant in 1993, a group of young theater artists founded the FTC with the mission of producing Shakespeare and the classics for modern audiences. FTC's first production was "The Mourning Dove" by Ken Kawaji, performed at BaseArt Gallery.  The company then produced a full season of five plays in various local venues, beginning with Shakespeare’s The Taming of the Shrew at Gabriel’s Corner in Over-the-Rhine.

Staff

Cincinnati Shakespeare Company is currently led by producing artistic director, Brian Isaac Phillips.  As of 2015 the company employed 46 artists: a company of 27 professional actors and stage managers (including 17 members of Actor’s Equity), 14 professional directors, designers, and technicians, and six arts administration professionals with and operating budget of almost $1.5 million.

Completing the Canon

In 2014, with their production of The Two Noble Kinsmen, Cincinnati Shakespeare Company became one of the first 5 theaters in the United States to complete the canon.

References

Shakespearean theatre companies
Theatre companies in Cincinnati